Soundwave or Sound Wave may refer to: 

 Sound, a vibration that propagates as an acoustic wave
 Acoustic wave, the wave which carries sound

Festivals
 Soundwave (Australian music festival), an annual music festival 2007–2016
 Soundwave Festival (San Francisco), a biennial sound, art and music festival in the US

Music
 Sound Wave (album), by Stanley Huang, 2003
 Sound Wave, a 2013 album by Makua Rothman
 "Sound Wave", a song by Yusef Lateef from the 1966 album A Flat, G Flat and C

Other
 Soundwave (Transformers), a fictional character 
 Soundwave (mobile application)
 The Wave 96.4 FM, formerly 96.4 Sound Wave, a Welsh radio station
 Sound Wave, a marching band formed by Seattle Sounders FC supporters

See also

 Onda Sonora: Red Hot + Lisbon, a 1998 compilation album

 
 
 Sound (disambiguation)
 Wave (disambiguation)